Jenny Maria Upari (30 January 1882 – 9 April 1948) was a Finnish trade unionist and politician. A member of the Social Democratic Party, she was elected to Parliament in 1907 as one of the first group of female MPs. She was the youngest member of the first parliament, and also the first to take maternity leave. She remained an MP until the following year.

Biography
Upari was born Jenny Maria Kilpiäinen in Vyborg in 1882. She worked as a weaver and married Villehad Nuotio, a policeman, taking his surname. The couple had two children. She also became secretary and treasurer of the Federation of Women Workers.

She contested the 1907 elections on the Social Democratic Party's list in Kuopio East and was one of 19 women elected to parliament. She was the youngest member of the first parliament, and was also pregnant when taking office, becoming the first woman to take maternity leave while in parliament. However, she lost her seat in the 1908 elections. During her time in parliament she sat on the Finance Committee and the Grand Committee.

After marrying Juho Aleksi Upari in 1918, she took his surname. She died in Sipoo in 1948.

References

1882 births
1948 deaths
Politicians from Vyborg
People from Viipuri Province (Grand Duchy of Finland)
Social Democratic Party of Finland politicians
Members of the Parliament of Finland (1907–08)
Finnish trade unionists
Women members of the Parliament of Finland
20th-century Finnish women politicians